Lisa Kemmerer is an American academic who has written on animal ethics and environmental ethics. She is an associate professor of philosophy and religion at Montana State University Billings, and is the author or editor of nine books.

Life 
Kemmerer studied at Reed College, at Harvard and at Glasgow University in Scotland, where in 1999 she completed a PhD with a dissertation on Protectionism: applying ethics consistently. She is an associate professor at Montana State University in Billings, Montana, where she teaches philosophy and religious studies. In 2012 she researched wildlife conservation in Kenya and Peru. Kemmerer has coined the term anymal as a "correct" term for non-human animals.

Publications 

 In Search of Consistency: Ethics And Animals. Leiden: Brill, 2006.
 Curly Tails and Cloven Hooves, poems. Georgetown, Kentucky: Finishing Line Press, 2011.
 as editor, with Anthony J. Nocella: Call to Compassion: Reflections on World Religions and Animal Advocacy. New York: Lantern Books, 2011.
 Sister Species: Women, Animals, and Social Justice. Urbana: University of Illinois Press, 2011.
 Primate People: Saving Nonhuman Primates through Education, Advocacy, and Sanctuary. Salt Lake City: University of Utah Press, 2011.
 Animals and World Religions: Rightful Relations. Oxford: Oxford University Press, 2012.
 As editor: Speaking Up for Animals: An Anthology of Women's Voices. Boulder: Paradigm Publishers, 2012.
 Bear Necessities: Protecting Bears through Education, Advocacy, and Sanctuary. Leiden: Brill, 2015.
 Animals and the Environment: Advocacy, Activism, and the Quest for Common Ground. London; New York: Routledge, 2015.
 Eating Earth: Environmental Ethics and Dietary Choice. Oxford: Oxford University Press, 2015.

See also
 List of animal rights advocates

References

21st-century American philosophers
21st-century American women
American animal rights scholars
Animal ethicists
Ecofeminists
Harvard Divinity School alumni
Living people
Reed College alumni
Year of birth missing (living people)